HAT-P-41 is a binary star system. Its primary is a F-type main-sequence star. Its surface temperature is 6390 K. compared to the Sun, HAT-P-41 is enriched in heavy elements, with a metallicity Fe/H index of 0.21, but is much younger at an age of 2.2 billion years.

The candidate stellar companion was detected simultaneously with the planet discovery in 2012. A multiplicity survey in 2015 did confirm a dim stellar companion of later-K to early-M spectral class, with the probability of being a background star of 14%. By 2020, it was concluded the candidate companion star is probably gravitationally bound.

Planetary system
In 2012, one planet, named HAT-P-41b, was discovered on a tight, circular orbit around the primary star.

The planetary orbit is mildly misaligned with the equatorial plane of the star, misalignment angle equal to −22.1 degrees.

The transmission spectrum of HAT-P-41b taken in 2020 has resulted in contradictory interpretations. One team has concluded the planetary atmosphere is metal-rich, with clear water signatures and absorption bands from sodium, aluminum, titanium and vanadium compounds. Another team has interpreted the results as arising from a dense hydrogen atmosphere without detectable heavy elements, but with significant ionization. The atmosphere also appears to contain significant cloud and hazes. Neither heavy element compounds nor H− ion opacity were found in 2022 study.

The planetary equilibrium temperature is within 1700-1950 K, and the dayside temperature has been measured at 1622 K.

References

Binary stars
Aquila (constellation)
Planetary transit variables
F-type main-sequence stars
Planetary systems with one confirmed planet
J19491743+0440207